Euphoria is an emotional and mental state defined as a sense of great happiness and well-being.

Euphoria may also refer to:

Biology
 Euphoria (beetle), a genus of scarab beetles
 Euphoria, a genus name previously used for the longan and other trees

Music

Groups 
 Euphoria (American band), a folk-rock/sunshine pop band from New York, or their eponymous 1969 album
 Euphoria (Australian band), a 1990s Australian pop/dance trio
 Euphoria (Canadian band), an active Canadian dance music project, or their eponymous 1999 album
 Euphoria (Indian band), an active Indian rock group formed in 1989
 Eu Phoria, a Japanese all-girl pop/rock band formed in 2002

Albums 
 Euphoria (CNBLUE album), 2016
 Euphoria (Dead Man album) or the title song, 2008
 Euphoria (Def Leppard album), 1999
 Euphoria (Enrique Iglesias album), 2010
 Euphoria (Leftover Salmon album) or the title song, 1997
 Euphoria (Ruslana album), 2012
 Euphoria (Vinnie Vincent album) or the title song, 1997
 Euphoria (compilations), a dance-music series, 1999–2004
 Euphoria, by Surfact, 2009
 Euphoria (Original Score from the HBO Series), by Labrinth, 2019
 Euforia (La Mafia album), 1998
 Euforia – Helen Sjöholm sjunger Billy Joel, or the title song, by Helen Sjöholm, 2010

Songs 
 "Euphoria" (Angels & Airwaves song), 2021
 "Euphoria" (BTS song), 2018
 "Euphoria" (Loreen song), Swedish entry and winner of Eurovision 2012
 "Euphoria" (The Perry Twins song), 2018
 "Euphoria" (Usher song), 2012
 "Euphoria", by Collide from Some Kind of Strange, 2003
 "Euphoria", by DJ Tiësto from Parade of the Athletes, 2004
 "Euphoria", by Don Toliver from Heaven or Hell, 2020
 "Euphoria", by Killing Joke from Pylon, 2015
 "Euphoria", by Kyle Ward from the video game series In the Groove
 "Euphoria", by Muse from Will of the People, 2022
 "Euphoria", by Sarah Slean from The Baroness, 2008
 "Euphoria", by Sirenia from An Elixir for Existence, 2004
 "Euphoria", by W.A.S.P. from Unholy Terror, 2001
 "Euphoria", by the Youngbloods from Earth Music, 1968
 "Euphoria", by the Holy Modal Rounders from their self-titled first album, 1964
 "Euphoria (Firefly)", by Delerium from Karma, 1997
 "Euphoria", by Michael Jackson from Music & Me, 1973

Film and television
Euphoria (2006 film), a 2006 Russian dramatic film by Ivan Vyrypaev
Euphoria (2017 film), a 2017 film by Swedish director Lisa Langseth
Euphoria (2018 film), a 2018 Italian film
Euphoria (Israeli TV series), a 2012–2013 Israeli television series
Euphoria (American TV series), a 2019 American series based on the Israeli series
"Euphoria, Part 1" and "Euphoria, Part 2" (2006), a two-part episode of the American television series HouseEufòria (TV series), a Catalan music talent show

 Computing 
 Euphoria (software), a game animation engine software by NaturalMotion
 Euphoria (programming language), an interpreted programming language

Sports
 New York Euphoria (formerly "Team Euphoria"), a team in the Lingerie Football League
 WWC Euphoria, an event of World Wrestling Council
 Euforia (wrestler) (born 1974), Mexican professional wrestler

Others
 4-Methylaminorex (commonly known as "Euphoria" or "U4EA"), a stimulant drug with effects comparable to methamphetamine
 Euphoria, a 2014 novel by Lily King

See also
 Euphoric (disambiguation)
 Euphorbia, a plant genusUFOria, 1985 American comedy film
 Uforia Audio Network, American radio network
 Ufouria: The Saga'', 1991 video game